YMO may refer to:

 Yellow Magic Orchestra, the Japanese synthpop band
 Yellow Magic Orchestra (album), the band's debut album
 Moosonee Airport, the IATA airport code
 Young Men Organization, an auxiliary organization of The Church of Jesus Christ of Latter-day Saints for adolescent boys
 Young Muslim Organisation, in the United Kingdom
 Yugoslav Muslim Organization
 Yangum language, by ISO 639 code